Türklər is a village and municipality in the Beylagan District of Azerbaijan. It has a population of 1,250.  "Turkler" means "Turks" in the Azerbaijani language.

References

Populated places in Beylagan District